Yan Li (born 1955) is a Beijing-born Chinese-Canadian fiction author who has written in both Chinese and English. In China, she worked as a translator, instructor and journalist. Having moved to Canada in 1987, her 1995 novel Daughters of the Red Land, felt by some to be autobiographical, was a finalist for a Books in Canada First Novel Award. She teaches at Renison University College and has been director of the Confucius Institute at the University of Waterloo. Her novel Lily in the Snow (2009) followed a Chinese immigrant family in Ontario.

Novels
Daughters of the Red Land (1995)
Lily in the Snow (2009)

References

20th-century Canadian novelists
20th-century Canadian women writers
21st-century Canadian novelists
21st-century Canadian women writers
Canadian women novelists
Chinese emigrants to Canada
20th-century Chinese novelists
20th-century Chinese women writers
21st-century Chinese novelists
21st-century Chinese women writers
Chinese women novelists
1955 births
Living people